The Portugal Golden Visa is an immigrant investor program  by the government of Portugal that granted residency in Portugal to people who invested in properties worth at least €500,000 or created 10 jobs in Portugal.

History
The scheme began in 2012, and in May 2020 has been credited with investments of over 5.2 billion euros from over 20,000 persons (8,736 investors and 14,936 family members).

In August 2019, according to SEF,  Chinese investment in Portugal under the scheme was down during the first eight months of 2019 a decrease of 15.7 percent from the same period of 2018. Investment by Brazilian nationals under the same scheme was up by almost 42 percent in 2019. Spain and Greece have programs comparable to Portugal's Gold Visa program.

Eligibility
The eligibility criteria to obtain a Portugal Golden Visa included:
 A Capital Transfer with a value equal to or above €1 million
 The creation of at least 10 jobs
 The purchase of real estate property of at least €280,000 or above
 The purchase of real estate property, with construction dating back more than 30 years or located in urban regeneration areas, for refurbishing, for a total value equal to or above €350,000
 Capital transfer with a value equal to or above €350,000 for investing  in research activities conducted by public or private scientific research institutions involved in the national scientific or technologic system
 Capital transfer with a value equal to or above €250,000 for investing  in artistic output or supporting the arts
 Capital transfer of the amount of €350,000, or higher, for the acquisition of units of investment funds or venture capital fund of funds dedicated to the capitalization of companies, capital injected under the Portuguese legislation, whose maturity, at the moment of the investment, is, at least, of five years and, at least, 60% of the investments is realized in commercial companies with head office in national territory
 Capital transfer of the amount of €350,000, or higher, for constitution of a commercial society with head office in the national territory, combined with the creation of five permanent working jobs, or for the reinforcement of the share capital of a commercial society with head office in national territory, already existing, with the creation or keeping of working jobs, with a minimum of five permanent jobs, and for a minimum period of three years.

Portuguese, European Union and European Economic Area nationals are not eligible for the ARI / Golden Visa scheme.

See also
Immigrant investor programs

References

Cost Of Living Portugal Golden Visa

External links
 

Economy of Portugal
Immigration to Portugal
Visa policies in Europe